Ctenopleura is a genus of echinoderms belonging to the family Astropectinidae.

The species of this genus are found in Japan, Malesia and Australia.

Species:

Ctenopleura astropectinides 
Ctenopleura fisheri 
Ctenopleura ludwigi 
Ctenopleura sagamina

References

Astropectinidae
Asteroidea genera